Inga-Lisa Wede (born 27 September 1951 in Övertorneå Municipality, Sweden) is a Swedish journalist, working for Sveriges Radio. From 2003 until his death in 2020 she was married to the actor Sven Wollter.

References

Swedish journalists
1951 births
Living people
People from Övertorneå Municipality